The 1966 Firecracker 400 was a NASCAR Grand National Series event that was held on July 4, 1966, at Daytona International Speedway in Daytona Beach, Florida.

Race report
Forty-six Thousand two hundred fans would attended this event. It took two hours and thirty-six minutes to finish. Four cautions slowed the race for 23 laps. Sam McQuagg would beat Darel Dieringer by one minute and six seconds.

This was the first time that a rear spoiler would be used in any NASCAR Cup Series race. On the day of the race, the factory engineers at Dodge would install this new invention on McQuagg's car (which caused him to go several miles per hour faster than his opponents).

Individual winnings for this event ranged from the winner's share of $13,600 ($ when considering inflation) to the last-place finisher's share of $350 ($ when considering inflation). A total of $55,105 was handed out to every driver ($ when considering inflation).

Qualifying

Finishing order

 Sam McQuagg† (No. 98)
 Darel Dieringer† (No. 16)
 Jim Paschal† (No. 14)
 Curtis Turner† (No. 13)
 Jim Hurtubise† (No. 56)
 Don White (No. 31)
 Marvin Panch (No. 04)
 Tiny Lund† (No. 24)
 James Hylton (No. 48)
 John Sears† (No. 4)
 Buddy Baker*† (No. 3)
 Frank Warren (No. 79)
 Elmo Langley† (No.64)
 Bobby Allison (No. 2)
 David Pearson† (No. 6)
 Harold Smith (No. 55)
 Larry Hess (No. 44)
 Eddie MacDonald (No. 89)
 Wendell Scott† (No. 34)
 Blackie Watt (No. 93)
 J.D. McDuffie† (No.70)
 Jack Lawrence (No. 06)
 Henley Gray (No. 97)
 LeeRoy Yarbrough*† (No. 12)
 Roy Mayne† (No. 00)
 Jimmy Helms* (No. 53)
 Paul Goldsmith* (No. 99)
 Doug Cooper* (No. 02)
 Richard Petty* (No. 43)
 Earl Balmer* (No. 71)
 Mario Andretti* (No. 5)
 Wayne Smith* (No. 38)
 Buck Baker*† (No. 86)
 Bunkie Blackburn*† (No. 39)
 G.C. Spencer*† (No. 49)
 Buddy Arrington* (No. 69)
 J.T. Putney*† (No. 19)
 Bobby Johns* (No. 7)
 Jabe Thomas*† (No. 25)
 Joel Davis* (No. 33)

† signifies that the driver is known to be deceased 
* Driver failed to finish race

References

Firecracker 400
Firecracker 400
NASCAR races at Daytona International Speedway